Kotla Sultan Singh is a village near Amritsar city in the Amritsar district of Punjab, India. 

It is the birthplace of playback singer Mohammed Rafi. There have been many attempts by his fans to get a memorial to him built in his native village.

References

Villages in Amritsar district